Useni is a surname. Notable people with the surname include:

Jeremiah Useni (born 1943), Nigerian army general and politician
Mark Bako Useni (born 1970), Nigerian politician 
Nermin Useni (born 1980), Serbian-Kosovar Albanian football player
Useni Eugene Perkins (born 1932), American poet, playwright, activist, and youth worker